Luena, formerly known as Luso, is a city and municipality in eastern Angola, administrative capital of Moxico Province. The municipality had a population of 357,413 in 2014.

History
The Angolan town is best known as the resting place of former UNITA rebel leader Jonas Savimbi, who was shot and killed by Angolan government troops on February 22, 2002.  Later on January 3, 2008, Savimbi's tomb at Luena Main Cemetery was vandalised and four members of the youth wing of the MPLA were charged and arrested.

Climate

Transportation

Luena is serviced by Luena Airport on the north side of the town.

Luena Train Station (Estação Ferroviaria De Luena) is a stop on the Benguela railway central line connecting Luau with Lobito. The station was rebuilt and features a clock tower.

Sports

 Estádio Comandante Jones Kufuna Yembe - Mundunduleno (football stadium)
 Bravos do Maquis Football Club

Notes

External links 
 
 Web Site showing Luena and western experiences in the city

Populated places in Moxico Province
Municipalities of Angola
Provincial capitals in Angola